The 1987 Virginia Slims of Chicago was a women's tennis tournament played on indoor carpet courts at the UIC Pavilion in Chicago, Illinois in the United States and was part of the Category 3 tier of the 1987 WTA Tour. It was the 16th edition of the tournament and was held from November 9 through November 15, 1987. First-seeded Martina Navratilova won the singles title, her second consecutive and eighth in total at the event.

Finals

Singles
 Martina Navratilova defeated  Natasha Zvereva 6–1, 6–2
 It was Navratilova's 4th singles title of the year and the 129th of her career.

Doubles
 Claudia Kohde-Kilsch /  Helena Suková defeated  Zina Garrison /  Lori McNeil 6–4, 6–3

Reference

External links
 International Tennis Federation (ITF) tournament edition details
 Tournament draws

Virginia Slims of Chicago
Ameritech Cup
Virginia Slims of Chicago
Virginia Slims of Chicago
Virginia Slims of Chicago